Jérôme Gilloux (born 22 May 1994) is a French mountain-biker specialising in the e-MTB event.

Gilloux was born on 22 May 1994. At the inaugural e-MTB world championship in 2019, he came second after Alan Hatherly from South Africa. At the 2020 UCI Mountain Bike World Championships he again came second, this time beaten by the United Kingdom's Tom Pidcock. At the 2021 UCI Mountain Bike World Championships, he took the world championship title. He defended his world championship title at the 2022 UCI Mountain Bike World Championships.

References

1994 births
Living people
French male cyclists
French mountain bikers